Lawrence Gordon may refer to:

 Lawrence Gordon (producer) (born 1936), American film executive
 Lawrence Gordon (character), a fictional character in the Saw film series
 Lawrence Gordon (gridiron football) (born 1984), professional Canadian football defensive back
 Lawrence Gordon (doctor), American doctor
 Lawrence A. Gordon, professor of managerial accounting and information assurance

See also
Larry Gordon (disambiguation)